Dibrugarh Lok Sabha constituency is one of the 14 Lok Sabha constituencies in Assam state in north-eastern India.

Assembly segments
Dibrugarh Lok Sabha constituency is composed of the following assembly segments:

Members of Parliament

Election results

2019 result

2014 result

2009 result

See also
 Dibrugarh district
 List of Constituencies of the Lok Sabha

References

External links
Dibrugarh lok sabha  constituency election 2019 date and schedule

Lok Sabha constituencies in Assam
Dibrugarh district